Brodie Crump Nalle (September 20, 1878 – February 2, 1952) was a physician from Charlotte, North Carolina.

His father Gustavus Brown Wallace Nalle was one of the VMI cadets at the Battle of New Market.  As a youth, he was a college football player, a quarterback for the Virginia Cavaliers football team. In 1900, he starred in the victory over Gallaudet.

He was the chief surgeon for the Piedmont and Northern Railway Company, and the Duke Power Company and its 
predecessor, Southern Utilities Company. He formed the Nalle Clinic in 1921. In 1941, he became a trustee of Duke University.

References

External links

1878 births
1952 deaths
Physicians from North Carolina
Virginia Cavaliers football players
American football quarterbacks
People from Culpeper County, Virginia
Players of American football from Virginia